Karkinit, Karkinitski, Carcinites, or Karkinitsky Bay (Karkinits’ka zatoka; , Karkinitskiy zaliv) is a bay of the Black Sea that separates the northwestern Crimean Peninsula from the mainland Ukraine. It was named after the early Greek settlement of Kerkinitis (Κερκινίτης) on the Crimean coast in place of modern Yevpatoria.

The northeastern tip of the Karkinitis Bay, by the Isthmus of Perekop, is known as the Perekop Bay or Gulf of Perekop.

The bay contains the preserve Karkinits'ka Zatoka State Zakaznik.

On the Marcator's map of 16th century the bay is named as Golfo de Nigropoli after the city on north shores of the Pontus Euxeinus. Nigropoli was a city located on the Silch River that flows in a bosom of the Eusino Sea to the west of the Crimea forms its own Gulf.

According to Strabo, another name for the Gulf of Carcinites was the Gulf of Tamyraca.

Gallery

References

External links
 The Mercator's map. Barry Lawrence Ruderman, Antique Maps Inc.

Bays of the Black Sea
Bays of Ukraine
Bays of Crimea
Ramsar sites in Ukraine